Uncut Dope: Geto Boys' Best is a compilation album by the Geto Boys consisting of previously released tracks from the group's Rap-a-Lot albums and two new songs. Released on November 17, 1992 through Priority Records, the compilation peaked at #147 on the Billboard 200.

The compilation's new songs were "The Unseen", which was subject to discussion due to lyrics expressing anti-abortion views, and "Damn It Feels Good to Be a Gangsta", which later appeared in the film Office Space.

Content

The compilation contained tracks from their first four albums: Grip It! On That Other Level (1989), The Geto Boys (1990) and We Can't Be Stopped (1991), although their first album, Making Trouble (1988), is only represented by the DJ recording, "Balls and My Word" (renamed to "And My Word" in the album's liner notes). Uncut Dope also contained two previously unreleased songs: "The Unseen" (which is the first Geto Boys song with Big Mike) and "Damn It Feels Good to Be a Gangsta". "Action Speaks Louder Than Words" originally appeared on Ganksta N-I-P's The South Park Psycho.

Reception

Track listing

Charts

References

1992 compilation albums
Geto Boys albums
Priority Records compilation albums
Rap-A-Lot Records compilation albums
Gangsta rap compilation albums